The New Guinean spiny bandicoots (genus Echymipera) are members of the order Peramelemorphia. They are found on New Guinea and nearby islands as well as on the Cape York Peninsula of Australia.

Species
All Echymipera species are native to New Guinea. The common echymipera and long-nosed echymipera are also found on neighboring islands.

Clara's echymipera (Echymipera clara)
David's echymipera (Echymipera davidi)
Common echymipera (Echymipera kalubu)
Long-nosed echymipera (Echymipera rufescens)
Menzies' echymipera (Echymipera echinista)

References

Peramelemorphs
Marsupials of New Guinea
Mammals of Papua New Guinea
Mammals of Western New Guinea
Taxa named by René Lesson